Guillaume Marie Charles Henri Mollat (1 February 1877 – 4 May 1968) was a French prelate and historian.

Biography 
Guillaume Mollat was born in Nantes on 1 February 1877. He studied at the Day School for Children Nantais, then entered the Saint-Sulpice Seminary in Paris in 1896, before completing his theological studies at the French Seminary in Rome. He thereafter integrated the École des hautes études and the Vatican School of Palaeography.

In 1933, he won the Prix of the Académie française for his work La question romaine de Pie VI à Pie XI.

He was elected a member of the Académie des Inscriptions et Belles-Lettres in 1954.

He died in Erbalunga on 4 May 1968.

Publications (selection) 

1903: Mesures fiscales exercées en Bretagne par les papes d'Avignon à l'époque du Grand schisme d'Occident
 
1930: Introduction à l'étude du droit canonique et du droit civile
1935: Lettres secrètes et curiales du pape Gregorius XI 1370–1378 relatives à la France
1950: Benoit XII (1334–1342): Lettres closes et patentes intéressant los pays autres que la France, publiées ou analysées d'après les registres du Vatican, Volume 1
1951: Le roi de France et la collation plénière (pleno jure) des bénéfices ecclésiastiques étude suivie d'un appendice sur les formulaires de la Chancellerie Royale
1966: Les Papes d'Avignon: (1305–1378)
1968: La Fiscalité Pontificale en France au: (Période d'Avignon et grand Schisme d'Occident.); Ouvrage conten. 2 cartes en coul. 14. Siècle

References

Sources 
1968: Henri-Charles Puech: Éloge funèbre de Mgr Guillaume Mollat, membre libre de l'Académie
1968: Charles Samaran: Éloge funèbre de Mgr Guillaume Mollat, académicien libre non résidant

External links 
 Guillaume Mollat on the site of the Académie française
 Mgr Guillaume Mollat (1877-1968). Enseignement à la Faculté : 1919-1945 on Persée
 La collation des bénéfices ecclésiastiques sous les papes d'Avignon (report) on Persée

1877 births
Writers from Nantes
1968 deaths
Breton Roman Catholic priests
20th-century French historians
Latin–French translators
Members of the Académie des Inscriptions et Belles-Lettres
Contributors to the Catholic Encyclopedia
Clergy from Nantes